Carlos Perón (born 9 June 1952) is a Swiss musician. He was a founding member of the band Yello.

Career
Born in Zürich, Switzerland, his first solo album was Impersonator (1981). Perón founded the TRANCEONIC studio in Zürich together with Boris Blank. In this experimental studio the two developed what would later on become the famous Yello sound. In 1978 Perón and Boris Blank made a trip to the U.S. to sell their music to the U.S. music industry. They visited RCA in Los Angeles and the Residents' label Ralph Records in San Francisco. After they returned to Switzerland Dieter Meier joined as a vocalist to form the trio Yello. The first maxi single of Yello came out (with "I.T. Splash" and "Glue Head") on the local label Periphery Perfume. In 1980 Yello released their first album Solid Pleasure. In 1981 Perón released his first solo album Impersonator on the label Konkurrenz/Phonogram, and Yello got a long term major deal on Phonogram through the managing director Louis Spillmann.  In the same year the Yello album Claro Que Si came out, and also Yello's first video (to the track "The Evening's Young"). In 1983 Perón released the soundtrack to the film Die Schwarze Spinne by director Mark M. Rissi on the label Milan Disques. The same year Yello issued their third LP You Gotta Say Yes to Another Excess.

In early 1983, just after release of You Gotta Say Yes to Another Excess, Perón left Yello in order to pursue a solo career. In 1985 he released his first oratorio Die Schöpfung der Welt; oder 7 Tage Gottes, again on Milan Disques. On the same label he published the video soundtrack to the war movie Commando Leopard by producer Erwin C. Dietrich. From 1991 on he worked with label owner Lothar Gärtner of Strange Ways Records; he produced solo works, solo artists like Joachim Witt and Peter Heppner and also bands like Wolfsheim, Sielwolf, The Cain Principle, Stalin, Cyrus, Recall and many others. In this phase he created the so-called fetish soundtracks like Terminatrix and La Salle Blanche. From 2006 on the music company SPV began to re-release Perón's entire solo works on Revisited Records worldwide. Perón now works worldwide as a music producer. In 2022 Perón took part in the "6122 - To Andy Fletcher Of Depeche Mode" project together with another 30 international artists.  The project was a double CD with charitable purpose in memory of Andy Fletcher, founding member of the British synthpop band Depeche Mode, who died on May 26th, 2022. 

1952 births
Living people
Musicians from Zürich
Swiss record producers
20th-century Swiss musicians
Swiss people of Spanish descent
Synth-pop musicians
21st-century Swiss musicians